François Collignon (c. 1609 – 18 January 1687) was a French engraver, print-seller and publisher.

Collignon was born in Nancy, France. He initially locally trained in the studio of Jacques Callot. After 1630 he moved to Italy where he continued his studies and established his own business. Although he started as an engraver, Collignon became a major figure in publishing and print-selling. Artists he produced works for included Pietro Testa, Cornelis Bloemaert, Pietro da Cortona, Nicolas Poussin, Charles Le Brun, Simon Vouet, and Jean Le Pautre. He died in Rome January 18, 1687.

The Flemish publisher and engraver Arnold van Westerhout who lived in Rome at that time bought the stock of François Collignon after his death in 1687.

References

French engravers
French printmakers
1609 births
1687 deaths